The  is a subcompact car which has been produced by the Japanese manufacturer Honda since 1981.

The City was originally a 3-door hatchback/2-door convertible for the Japanese, European and Australasian markets. The 3-door City was retired in 1994 after the second-generation and replaced by the Logo. The nameplate was revived in 1996 for use on a series of subcompact four-door sedans aimed primarily at developing markets, first mainly sold in Asia but later also in Latin America and Australia. Since then, it has been a subcompact sedan built on Honda's Global Small Car platform, which is shared with the Fit/Jazz (a 5-door hatchback), the Airwave/Partner, and the first-generation Mobilio — all of which share the location of the fuel tank under the front seats rather than rear seats. The seventh-generation model launched in 2019 features a significant size growth, offering an exterior dimension on par with the ninth-generation Civic sedan. This generation also marks the introduction of the 5-door hatchback model starting from 2020.

The City is also sold as the Honda Ballade in South Africa since 2011. The City was reintroduced in Japan in 2014, this time called the  up to its discontinuation in 2020. Between 2015 and 2019, Dongfeng Honda sold a remodeled version of the City called the Honda Greiz, and its 5-door liftback counterpart Honda Gienia.



First generation (AA/FV/FA; 1981) 

The first Honda City (AA for sedans, VF for vans and FA for the wider Turbo II and Cabriolets) was introduced in November 1981 with the innovative "Tallboy" design; of unusual height it enabled four adults to fit comfortably in the very short City (under ). Produced as a 3-door hatchback in a variety of trim levels, the City was also available together with the Motocompo, a special 50 cc 'foldaway' scooter with  designed to fit in the City's small luggage area ("trunk"); called a trunk bike, Honda called this type of scooter trabai. At the time of its introduction, it was Honda's smallest car, while not being in compliance with Japanese government kei regulations.

The Honda City Turbo was introduced in September 1982.  It was powered by a turbocharged version of the 1231 cc Honda ER engine. A Pininfarina designed drop-top Cabriolet utilized the wider fenders and bigger bumpers of the Turbo II "Bulldog", but was only available with the naturally aspirated  engine. There was also a Pro-series of van versions with either two or four seats. A high-roof "R Manhattan Roof" version with a  taller roof also appeared.

Exports of the City were primarily to Europe (where it was renamed Honda Jazz, due to Opel having trademarked the City name), Australia (in two-seater 'van' form, to circumvent Australian import restrictions on passenger vehicles at the time) and New Zealand (where it was locally assembled). Production ended in late 1986 with the introduction of the GA type City.

Second generation (GA; 1986) 

Honda replaced the original City series AA in November 1986 with this generation (designated GA1), and again with an update in 1989 (GA2). This model was produced until 1994. The Fit name also first appeared as a trim variant of the second-generation City. There was no convertible model, with both the convertible and Turbo models of the previous generation continuing on sale for a little while. In most markets aside from Japan, the City's market position was left open until filled by the Honda Logo in 1999.

On 31 October 1986, the second-generation City was introduced with the slogan "City of Talent." in Japan, and was available at Honda Clio dealerships. The Honda Clio dealership chain was being positioned as Honda's purveyor of luxuriously equipped vehicles like the Honda Legend, the Honda Concerto, and the Honda Accord, and this generation City enabled Clio locations to sell economically priced vehicles normally found at Honda Primo.

In this remodel, there are major changes in the appearance of the vehicle Honda called "Crouching form", which consisted of a low and wide design that contributed to lighter vehicle weight (basic grade 680 kg) combined with improvements in driving performance. The styling reflects a corporate decision to enact a shared appearance with the first-generation Honda Today kei car, the internationally strong seller, third-generation subcompact Honda Civic, and the third-generation compact Honda Accord AeroDeck. This generation shared its exterior dimensions and engine size almost exactly with the first-generation Civic. The Honda CR-X was the only three-door hatchback that adopted a fastback, sloping rear hatch, similar to the Honda Verno products during the mid-1980s.

The engine configuration introduced the Honda D series, in the form of the type D12A, a 1.2 L SOHC straight-four 16-valve unit (1986, first as a mechanism for domestic vehicles) only available with a single carburetor, and basic level of equipment. The difference between the "GG" / "EE" / "BB" were just in the level of equipment. A five-speed manual or a four-speed automatic transmission were optional.

In October 1988, the main engine was changed to 1.3 L I4 SOHC type D13C. At this time, in addition to the traditional single carburetor, and introduced Honda's PGM-FI fuel injection. Single carburetor specification, the 1.2 L "BE" the other 1.3 L "CE" / "CG" is set, PGM-FI, spec, "CR-i" / "CZ-i" and consists of two trim packages.

The "CE" grade equipment with enhanced savings "CE Fit", PGM-FI specification is "CR-i" based only high-grade "CR-i Limited" was introduced, the late "CZ-i" is defined as the minor trim package. The word "Fit" appears as a trim package on the base grade "CE".

At the end of this generation, by grade consolidation, "Fit"  is used for all single carburetor vehicles. The trim package "Fit" later became the model name of the successor of the Honda Logo which replaced this car.

The second generation was discontinued in 1993. In Japan, the name "City" was retired at the end of this series' conclusion of production. The replacement vehicles introduced in 1996 on the GA base were renamed Honda Logo (three-door hatchback, GA3/5 series), and the Honda Capa with five-door hatchback bodywork.

Third generation (3A/SX; 1996) 

The City was revived as a subcompact four-door sedan, slotting beneath the Honda Civic, for developing markets in Asia. The third-generation City (first-generation as a sedan), codenamed SX8 but with chassis codes 3A2 (1.3) and 3A3 (1.5), was based on the EF Civic platform to cut costs. It was designed for and sold in the Southeast Asian market only, and launched with the slogan "Smart for the new generation" for the 1.3-litre version and "Top-in-class smart" slogan for the 1.5-litre model. First production began in an all-new plant in Ayutthaya, Thailand, in April 1996. The car had a dominant position in the market. From the beginning, the Thai-made City models had more than 70% local content. The bumpers were constructed in three separate pieces to allow for easier shipping from Japan. There were originally a lower grade LXi and a higher-spec EXi available. The sedan also marked Honda's entrance in the Indian market in 1998 and it quickly became a success and one of the top selling cars in its segment.

The City was built in additional markets including: India, Indonesia, Malaysia, Pakistan, the Philippines and Taiwan. In Pakistan, the City received a lukewarm reception at first, but the third generation was a massive hit. A revised, facelifted third-generation City was released in 2000, called the "Type Z" in some markets. By 2001 a model powered by Honda's 1.5 L VTEC engines (VTI) appeared, with a rear-stabilizer for better handling. The facelift model received new front end tail lights, as well as one-piece bumpers.

The third-generation City had fuel-injected SOHC 16-valve D-series engines, namely variations of the D13B and D15B. The original  D13B produced  at 6,400 rpm for a claimed top speed of 171 km/h and 0–100 km/h in 11.3 seconds. This was later complemented by the 1.5-litre D15B, which was reduced in power for the Asian markets where the car was sold. The D15B engine also arrived in a version with VTEC (B15C2 engine).

Fourth generation (GD/GE; 2002) 

The fourth-generation City (second-generation as a sedan) made its world debut at the Thailand International Motor Expo in Bangkok in November 2002. Development of the vehicle continued to be handled by Honda Thailand. It was launched in Japan as the Fit Aria on 20 December 2002, as a captive import sourced from Thailand. The word "aria" is a type of expressive melody, usually heard in opera. Honda chose the word, continuing its musical naming tradition used with the Honda Prelude, the Honda Accord, the Honda Ballade, the Honda Quint, and the Honda Concerto. It was offered as a four-wheel drive version.

The City was initially launched with a twin-spark, lean burn ‘i-DSI’ engine producing 88PS that was primarily designed to provide outstanding fuel economy. The VTEC version was unveiled late in the fourth-generation City's lifespan in 2004. The VTEC trim of the City is offered with 15-inch alloy wheels compared to the 14-inch offered in the i-DSI and the rear brakes are solid discs on the VTEC variant instead of drums in the i-DSI. Also, the VTEC model uses a 7-speed Multimatic CVT automatic transmission.

Facelift

In September 2005, a facelifted version of the City was launched in Thailand, in October 2005 in Malaysia, and in November 2005 in Indonesia. In Thailand, it is known as the City ZX. The most significant changes are a new exterior (new front grille, new headlamps, new fog lights, new tail lights and bumpers). The side mirror is electronically foldable. Both the i-DSI and VTEC trim levels have 15-inch alloy wheels as standard equipment. The changes in interior are minor but it does include an armrest for the driver and additional map lights. The interior colour tone of the VTEC variant is now black.

The L-series engine remained but the intake manifold has been repositioned, resulting in a 6 °C drop in the intake air temperature, the suspension has been upgraded as well.

The City in India, Indonesia, Malaysia, Pakistan, the Philippines, Singapore and Thailand uses the CVT gearbox for both i-DSI and VTEC variants. The CVT gearbox simulates a 7-speed automatic transmission with Tiptronic style override using paddle shift buttons on the steering wheel itself.

The fourth generation was resurrected in China as the Everus S1, a new budget car brand for Honda models discontinued elsewhere. The S1 stopped production in 2014.

Models
City/Fit Aria:
 GD6: 1.3 L L13A i-DSI I4 2WD (Fit-Aria)
 GD7: 1.3 L L13A i-DSI I4 4WD (Fit-Aria)
 GD8: 1.5 L L15A i-DSI/VTEC I4 2WD (Fit-Aria)
 GD9: 1.5 L L15A i-DSI/VTEC I4 4WD (Fit-Aria)

Everus S1 (China)

In 2011, Chinese joint venture Guangqi Honda released a badge-engineered version of the fourth-generation City under their new Everus brand, called the S1. With the release of Everus, Honda became the first foreign automaker to develop vehicles under a brand owned by its local joint venture automaker in China.

The S1 is the first Everus car available for sale. It shares most of the characteristics found in the fourth-generation City. Dimensions and powertrains are identical as well with the S1 sporting the same 4,420 mm length and 1.3-litre i-DSi or 1.5-litre VTEC L-series petrol engine. The engines are paired to either a 5-speed manual or 5-speed automatic transmission. The S1 concluded production in 2014.

Fifth generation (GM2/3; 2008) 

The fifth-generation City (third-generation as a sedan) was unveiled in Bangkok, Thailand in September 2008 followed by launches in India, Pakistan, Malaysia, Indonesia, the Philippines, Singapore and China (Guangzhou Honda) in the following months. For the third-generation of the City, Honda has given the car a longer front overhang and wheelbase as well as a lower roof than the hatchback to give it more of an ideal sedan proportions compared to its predecessor.

The City was available with a range of four-cylinder engines include a 1.3-litre engine producing  at 6,000 rpm, a 1.5-litre engine putting out , which both are available in manual and automatic transmissions (India and Indonesia) and a 1.8-litre R18A engine (China markets only). In South America the range is offered with the i-VTEC 1.5-litre flex-fuel engine that is shared with the Brazilian Honda Fit. The power output is 115 hp with petrol and 116 hp using ethanol. Manual and automatic gearboxes are available.

The City was also briefly offered in selected European countries including Poland with a 1.4-litre i-VTEC engine mated to either a 5-speed manual or a 6-speed i-SHIFT automated manual transmission.

In the Philippines, the fifth-generation City was launched in 2009 available in 2 trims: 1.3 S and 1.5 E. The 1.3 S was offered in either 5-speed manual transmission or 5-speed automatic while the E trim was only available in 5-speed automatic transmission with paddle shifters.

It was released in India in November 2008. The City became the best-selling model of the company in the country, with sales volume even surpassing that of Thailand, previously the best selling market for the City. The City has been the leader in the mid-sized sedan segment for a decade, with 35% market share in 2010. In India it came with a 1.5-litre petrol engine mated to a manual transmission or a 5-speed automatic.

In Pakistan, the City was launched on 31 January 2009, just four months after its international debut. It was only offered in 1.3-litre variant but then 1.5 was launched after a few years.

In February 2009, Honda Australia released the Thai-made City into the Australian market in two 1.5-litre variants (VTi and VTi-L). According to an Honda Australia executive, Yasuhide Mizuno, the City would compete with other light sedans such as the Japanese built Toyota Yaris, the Korean-made Holden Barina and the Nissan Tiida. This was the first City released in Australia since the 1980s. It replaced the formerly smaller-sized Civics.

The City was launched in 2011 in South Africa as the Ballade, to fit below the Civic and above the Jazz sold there.

Facelift

In September 2011, Honda Thailand revealed the revamped City, with new front grille design, new front and rear bumpers, new taillamps design, new alloy wheels, eco driving indicator and dual front airbags to every model. The revised model was launched in India in December 2011 including five variants – Corporate, E, S, V and V (Sunroof) – and increased ground clearance to 165 mm (previously 160 mm) and also length increased by 20 mm.

In August 2012, Honda Thailand released the City CNG.

The facelifted City was also launched in the Philippines in early 2012. It had a redesigned front grille, front and rear bumper and new alloy wheels for the 1.5 E model, blue illumination gauge and silver accent air conditioning switch. In 2013, a new designed alloy wheels was introduced for both 1.3 and 1.5 variants. A Modulo version was available in both models and in 2013 a Mugen version was available for the 1.5 model only.

Honda Cars India launched the facelifted fifth-generation City in India. All variants were powered by the same 1.5-litre i-VTEC petrol engine which delivers  of power with 146 Nm of maximum torque.

The diesel version of the City was launched in India in early January 2014, powered by the 1.5-litre Earth Dreams i-DTEC turbodiesel engine. It was only manufactured in a limited numbers and were distributed to some selected dealers in some states of India.

Honda Atlas (Pakistan) resumed the production of City on May 1, 2012, after it was halted due to supply chain disruption caused by massive flooding in Thailand. This resumption of production was marked by Honda as it comes with the range of facelifted City under the banner of City Aspire. In October 2014, Honda Atlas launched the facelifted City, with new features including new taillights, revamped chrome grille, blinkers on side mirrors, rear window brake light, keyless entry system and new bumpers. The interior also received some changes. The speedometer dials were changed from orange to blue optitron. This generation of City remained in production in Pakistan until 2021.

Production

The City is produced in a number of locations around the world including Brazil, India, Pakistan, the Philippines, Turkey and Thailand.

In July 2009, the City was for the first time to be built and marketed (in large numbers) outside Asia, with production commenced in Sumaré, Brazil. The car was first available for sale in the Brazilian market, with exports to Mexico and other markets in Latin America from September 2009.

Since March 2011, with the opening of a new factory, the City began to be manufactured in Argentina. It is the first car built by Honda in Argentina (and the first Japanese passenger car made in Argentina) and will be exported to all the countries in South America along with the Citys built in the Brazilian Sumaré plant.

Safety

Sixth generation (GM4/5/6/8/9; 2014) 

Debuted in India, the sixth-generation City (fourth-generation as a sedan) is Honda's second model to incorporate the new "Exciting H" design which was first seen on the third-generation Fit/Jazz that launched in September 2013. It also won the award of 'Middle East Car of the Year 2014'. It is continued to be built on the Fit/Jazz platform.

The notable change of this generation is the repositioning of the fuel tank from the middle to the rear of the vehicle. This allowed the seating position to be lowered to give a sportier driving feel, while the height of the roof also lowered to achieve lower centre of gravity and sleeker exterior design.

The new City in its range topping trim features extensive premium equipment and kits, such as touch-panel auto climate control, rear AC vents, a 5-inch LCD display with navigation, Bluetooth audio, a reverse camera, eight speakers, and four power outlets. Based on Honda's new "Exciting H-Design" philosophy, the sedan gave a more refreshing and a  premium look than its predecessor. The overall height is increased by 10 mm, while rest of the dimensions remain the same.

Facelift
The mid-life facelift for the sixth-generation City was launched in Thailand on 12 January 2017. The facelift includes visual and equipment updates such as LED headlamps with daytime running lights and LED tail lights, while the revised chrome bar grille is similar to that of its bigger sibling, the Civic. The facelift model was also subsequently launched in India on 14 February 2017, in Malaysia on 2 March 2017, in Indonesia on 16 March 2017, in the Philippines on 22 May 2017 and in Japan as the Grace in July 2017.

A new hybrid variant was also introduced, though only exclusive to Japan and Malaysia. It uses Honda's Intelligent-Dual Clutch Drive (i-DCD) Sport Hybrid system, paired with a 7-speed dual clutch transmission.

Markets

Brazil
The City was introduced in Brazil as its fourth generation model in the country in 2015. Following the current Fit, both were produced at the Sumaré plant. Only the 1.5-litre petrol engine is available, with either manual transmission or CVT. It is not equipped with direct injection.

China
In China, the City is manufactured by Guangqi Honda, where there is another derived model, Honda Greiz, manufactured by Dongfeng Honda, with different body lines, front and rear fascias. Another derivative called the Honda Gienia is the City in liftback form. Production for the Greiz commenced in November 2015 while the Gienia commenced production in October 2016.

Trim levels for the Greiz are the Classic, Comfort, Fashion and Luxury all shared with the Gienia. The L15B is the only engine option available paired with a 5-speed manual (for Classic) or CVT gearbox.

Apart from Dongfeng Honda and Guangqi Honda, Honda Automobile (China) also manufactured the City for exports to Mexico.

India
The sixth-generation City was unveiled in India on 25 November 2013 and is available with a choice of two engines; a new 1.5-litre Earth Dreams i-DTEC turbodiesel and a refined version of the 1.5-litre i-VTEC petrol. The new 1.5-litre turbo-diesel engine, which also powers the Honda Amaze.

Honda launched the sixth-generation City in India on 7 January 2014. The sixth-generation City is available in five trim levels – E, S, SV, V and VX for both petrol and diesel. The petrol automatic is available in SV and VX trims. While the City has always been a popular offering of Honda in India, its sales doubled after it was launched with a diesel engine. In March 2015, the City became the fastest selling compact sedan to reach the 100,000 mark in just 15 months.

In 2014, the Indian City contains about 90% local parts.

From April 2015, the City is available with an additional trim: VX (O). It is positioned above the VX.

In 2017, with the facelift, Honda launched a new top-of-the-line ZX trim in India which comes with 6 airbags, rear parking camera and Honda's digipad infotainment system. The facelifted City also comes with full LED headlamps and tail lamps and also a sunroof. Over 10,000 orders were received in less than a month after the facelifted 2017 City was released in mid-February 2017. The City became India's best selling compact sedan for the first half of 2017.

Japan
The City is offered and sold as Honda Grace in Japan starting from December 2014, with both petrol and hybrid versions, and an all-wheel-drive option. Trim levels range from LX, Hybrid EX, Hybrid LX and Hybrid DX. Hybrid versions can be differentiated from its LED rear lamp clusters and on the Hybrid LX and Hybrid DX only, LED projector headlamps come as standard. The exterior dimensions are compliant with Japanese government dimension regulations and the engine displacement incurs a nominal annual road tax obligation.
The Grace was discontinued in the Japanese market in August 2020 alongside the Civic sedan and Jade, due to decreasing sales.

Malaysia
In Malaysia, the sixth-generation City was launched on 20 March 2014 available in four trim levels (all powered by 1.5-litre engine with CVT) are offered: S, S+, E and V.

On 2 March 2017, the facelifted City was introduced with 3 trims available: S, E and V.

As of 2017, the S+ trim was discontinued to make way for the Hybrid version, with Malaysia being only the second country after Japan to have the City Hybrid on sale. The locally assembled hybrid uses Honda's intelligent-Dual Clutch Drive (i-DCD) Sport Hybrid system. The hybrid was launched after an extensive two-year testing in Malaysia.

Philippines
In the Philippines, the sixth-generation City was launched on 22 April 2014 and is available in 3 trim levels. E, VX and VX+ 

In May 2017, a facelifted version of the City debuted in the Philippines with added LED headlights and fog lights for the VX+ and daytime running lights (DRLs) standard across the line.

Singapore
The City is available from Kah Motor (Honda's Singapore distributor) in 2 trim levels: V and SV. In 2018, with the facelifted City, the SV trim was further differentiated from the basic V trim with automatic climate controls, on top of the features previously offered prior to the facelift such as paddle shifters, push start, touchscreen head unit, fog lamps and 16” rims. However after the facelift, the SV received an aftermarket touchscreen DVD head unit instead of the factory fitted one.

It is also available as the Honda Grace through parallel import, in both petrol and hybrid versions.

Taiwan
Honda Taiwan first displayed the sixth-generation City at the 2014 Taipei Auto Show in which Honda also exhibited its NSX concept sports car. The Taiwanese market City was formally announced on 4 March 2014 and went on sale in the second quarter of the same year. This was the first time the City had been on sale in Taiwan since 2002, when the third-generation City ceased production. The model had ceased production in November 2020.

Thailand
The sixth-generation City received its ASEAN debut in Thailand on 23 January 2014. The 1.5-litre i-VTEC petrol engine, the only engine option for Thailand, has been tuned to comply with E85 fuel. The sixth-generation City is sold in six trim levels (S MT, S CVT, V CVT, V+ CVT, SV CVT and SV+ CVT). Certain Thai market variants are available with 2 airbags, Vehicle Stability Assist (VSA) and Hill Start Assist. 6 airbags is only available in top option SV+ trim (SV Plus).

Vietnam
The City, together with Honda CR-V, were Honda's top sellers in the country in 2014.

Pakistan
The sixth-generation City was launched in Pakistan in July 2021, replacing the long-running fifth-generation City. Assembled locally, it was launched with two engine option, which are 1.2-litre and 1.5-litre petrol engines.

Safety

Latin America

India

Australia

ASEAN markets

Seventh generation (GN; 2019) 

The seventh-generation City (fifth-generation as a sedan) was unveiled in Bangkok, Thailand, on 25 November 2019 in its sedan form. It shared its platform with the fourth-generation Fit/Jazz. While its dimensions have grown to the point that it is slightly larger than the ninth-generation Civic sedan (2011–2016), the City continues to be marketed and priced as a subcompact or B-segment car.

Hatchback 
The hatchback version was launched in November 2020; 26 years after the body style was last used in 1994. Honda claimed hatchback offers more legroom than the sedan and offers the Ultra Seats carried from the Fit/Jazz and HR-V, allowing for four rear seat arrangements – utility, long, tall and refresh modes. The City Hatchback serves as a replacement to the Fit/Jazz in several emerging markets (except in South Africa, Singapore and Brunei where the Fit/Jazz is sold), and is currently produced in Thailand, Indonesia, Malaysia, and Brazil.

Markets

India 
The City sedan was unveiled and launched in India on 16 July 2020. It is sold alongside the old model which is continued to be produced in the country. The Indian-market City is offered in three trim levels – V, VX and ZX – with a choice of petrol and diesel 1.5-litre four-cylinder engines. The petrol engine upgraded i-VTEC unit with DOHC (previously SOHC), with the other being an i-DTEC turbo-diesel. Both engines are paired with a 6-speed manual transmission as standard, with the CVT option only available for the petrol version.

All trims are fitted with ESC, rear ISOFIX anchorages, neck restraints and three-point seatbelts for all five passengers, dual front airbags, front torso-protecting side airbags, traction control and hill start assistance as standard, the VX and ZX trims are equipped with head-protecting curtain airbags, and the ZX trim level is fitted with a blind spot monitor. Unlike the Malaysian car, the Indian car is not approved for use with i-Size child seats. It has also not been crash-tested by Global NCAP because the fourth-generation car, which has been sold alongside the fifth-generation car, has a lower safety specification and was tested in 2022. Honda did not sponsor testing for the fifth-generation car.

For the first time, the top-spec City is equipped with Honda's LaneWatch camera system. Other notable features include 8.0-inch touchscreen audio system with Alexa remote capability and support for Android Auto and Apple CarPlay, 7.0-inch digital instrument cluster display, and sunroof.

Honda Cars India announced the market launch of the City e:HEV in April 2022. This powertrain is expected to be available on the ZX trim level. In addition, this trim is expected to be the first Honda model in India to offer Honda Sensing which includes safety assist technologies.

The facelifted City was launched on 2 March 2023 in both petrol and e:HEV. The City also gets Honda Sensing which includes safety assist technologies in both and Wireless Charging.

Indonesia 
The seventh-generation City was first launched in Indonesia on 3 March 2021 in its hatchback form. The City hatchback is produced in the country and directly replaced the Jazz. It went on sale on 8 April 2021. A single trim is offered, which is the RS with a 6-speed manual and CVT gearbox options. It is equipped with the 1.5-litre L15ZF engine. The City sedan followed later on 28 October 2021, which is imported from Thailand like previous models. On 20 April 2022, the City hatchback received Honda Sensing (CVT only) as an option.

Malaysia 
The City sedan was revealed in Malaysia on 24 August 2020 and launched to the market on 13 October 2020. It is available in 4 trim levels: S, E, V and e:HEV RS. The S, E, and V trims are powered by the 1.5-litre L15ZF DOHC naturally-aspirated engine, while the top-of-the-line RS trim is offered with an Intelligent Multi-Mode Drive (i-MMD) hybrid version to go along with the 1.5-litre LEB-H5 DOHC naturally-aspirated engine. The e:HEV RS trim received several features from the other trim levels including an electronic parking brake with auto brake hold function and a full Honda Sensing driver assistance safety suite which includes adaptive cruise control.

The V Sensing trim was launched on 3 November 2021. Unlike the normal V trim, it is equipped with 7-inch semi-digital instrument cluster panel and Honda Sensing safety and driver assist system similar to the e:HEV RS trim.

The City Hatchback was launched on 7 December 2021. It is offered in S, E, V and e:HEV RS trim levels, same with the City sedan. Like the sedan counterpart, the S, E, and V trims are powered by the 1.5-litre L15ZF DOHC naturally-aspirated engine, while the top-of-the-line RS trim is offered with an Intelligent Multi-Mode Drive (i-MMD) hybrid version to go along with the 1.5-litre LEB-H5 DOHC naturally-aspirated engine.

The V Sensing trim was launched on 11 April 2022. Like its sedan counterpart, it is equipped with 7-inch semi-digital instrument cluster panel and Honda Sensing safety and driver assist system similar to the e:HEV RS trim.

Philippines 
The City sedan was launched in the Philippines alongside the facelifted Honda CR-V on 22 October 2020. The new City is now imported from Thailand instead of being locally assembled in the now-defunct Honda Santa Rosa plant. The only engine released in the Philippine market is the 1.5-litre i-VTEC engine. Known as the L15ZF, the engine is relatively similar to the L15Z engine found in previous models with the exception of dual overhead cams and further implementation of Honda's Earth Dreams technology. Transmission options include a 6-speed manual and CVT. Three trim levels are available in the Philippine market: S (6-speed manual and CVT), V (CVT only) and RS (CVT only).

The City Hatchback was launched on 20 April 2021 and was the first market to get the hatchback in left-hand-drive form. Only a single trim is offered, which is the RS model.

Thailand 
In Thailand, the City is powered by a 1.0-litre VTEC Turbo petrol engine mated to a CVT. The smaller engine and the low emission output makes it the first City to qualify the Eco Car tax incentive. Among the conditions of the tax incentive are Euro 5 compliance,  emissions below , and a fuel consumption not exceeding . Other aspects of the Phase 2 Eco Car regulation include the fitment of various safety systems such as ABS, EBD, BA and VSA as standard across the range. It is available in four trim levels: S, V, SV and RS. Sales began in Thailand on 24 December 2019.

The City Hatchback debuted in Thailand on 24 November 2020. The City Hatchback is offered in just three variants, which are S+, SV and RS.

The City e:HEV RS was also launched in the country in the same day. The e:HEV version gets several additional features over the petrol RS, including paddle shift to adjust the regenerative braking intensity, a 7.0-inch instrument cluster display, Honda LaneWatch blind spot camera, rear AC vents, and rear disc brakes which in turn allows for an electric parking brake to be installed. The City Hatchback e:HEV RS was also launched in Thailand on 24 June 2021, with similar features as the sedan version.

Vietnam 
The City sedan was launched in Vietnam on 9 December 2020, with three trims being offered, which are the base 1.5 G, 1.5 L, and the top-spec 1.5 RS, all paired with CVT. In April 2021, the E trim was added to the lineup.

Brazil 
The City sedan and hatchback were introduced in Brazil on 18 November 2021. It is powered with the 1.5-litre direct injection i-VTEC DOHC engine, which was not offered in other markets before. The adoption of the direct injection system allows for a higher compression ratio and greater optimization of the burning of the air/fuel mixture. The engine also supports flex fuel.

Mexico 
The City sedan was launched in Mexico on 12 March 2021, offered in the Uniq, Sport, and Prime trim lines, all of them equipped with the 1.5-litre engine and offered in either a 6-speed manual transmission or an automatic CVT.

Top-spec City Touring was added for the 2022 model year, making the City available in four trims. The Touring trim features LED headlights and foglamps, and lots of safety features added from the Prime trim.

Powertrain 
Three conventional engines were offered in different markets, which are the 1.0-litre VTEC Turbo petrol engine (Thailand), 1.5-litre i-VTEC petrol engine and 1.5-litre i-DTEC diesel engine (India).

For this generation, the City e:HEV is also offered in some markets. It utilises the smallest version of Honda's Intelligent Multi-Mode Drive (i-MMD) hybrid system shared with the fourth-generation Fit/Jazz which consist of a 1.5-litre Atkinson cycle DOHC i-VTEC engine and an integrated electric motor acting as a generator and a starter. It is not equipped with a traditional gearbox driving the front wheels, however the engine can provide direct drive at higher speeds using a lock-up clutch and a single-speed transmission (e-CVT) since the ICE is more efficient than an electric motor at high speeds.

Safety

Sales
By 2017, cumulative sales of the City has exceeded 3.6 million units in over 60 countries around the world since the nameplate was revived in 1996. As of 2017, cumulative sales of the City reached 700,000 in India. Sales of the City in India contributes to 25 percent of global sales and the City is Honda's best selling model in India.

References

External links

  (Thailand)

City
Cars introduced in 1981
Cars of Turkey
1990s cars
2000s cars
2010s cars
2020s cars
Subcompact cars
Hatchbacks
Sedans
Convertibles
Front-wheel-drive vehicles
All-wheel-drive vehicles
Hybrid electric cars
Vehicles with CVT transmission
ANCAP superminis
ASEAN NCAP superminis
Global NCAP superminis
Latin NCAP superminis